Vladimir Soro (born 29 November 1967) is a politician in Serbia. He is currently serving his second term in the Assembly of Vojvodina as a member of the Movement of Socialists (Pokret socijalista, PS).

Private career
Soro is an agricultural engineer.

Politician

Early years
Soro entered political life as a member of the Socialist Party of Serbia. He appeared on the party's electoral list in the 2003 Serbian parliamentary election, receiving the 228th position out of 250 on a list that was mostly alphabetical. The list won twenty-two seats, and Soro did not receive a mandate. (From 2000 to 2011, Serbian parliamentary mandates were awarded to sponsoring parties or coalitions rather than individual candidates, and it was common practice for the mandates to be assigned out of numerical order. Soro's position on the list had no bearing on his chances of election.)

From 2004 to 2016, provincial elections in Vojvodina were held under a system of mixed proportional representation, with half of the mandates determined by elections in single-member constituency seats. Soro ran as the Socialist Party's candidate in Titel in the 2008 provincial election and finished in fourth place.

The Socialist Party experienced a split later in 2008, with Aleksandar Vulin forming the Movement of Socialists as a breakaway group. Soro sided with Vulin and joined the new party.

Assembly of Vojvodina
The PS joined the Serbian Progressive Party's electoral coalition prior to the 2012 provincial election. Soro again ran for the Titel constituency seat, this time under the banner of the Progressive-led Let's Get Vojvodina Moving alliance, and was elected in the second round of voting. The election was won by the Democratic Party and its allies, and Soro served in opposition for the next four years. He was not a candidate in the 2016 provincial election, which was the first to be held under a system of full proportional representation.

He was awarded the twenty-sixth position on the Progressive-led Aleksandar Vučić — For Our Children list in the 2020 provincial election and was elected to a second term when the list won a majority victory with seventy-six out of 120 mandates. He is now a member of the assembly committee on agriculture and the committee on petitions and motions.

Municipal politics
The PS ran its own electoral list in Titel for the 2012 Serbian local elections, and Soro appeared in the lead position. The list did not cross the electoral threshold to win any mandates. The PS subsequently formed an alliance with the Socialist Party for the 2016 local elections in Titel, and Soro was given the eighth position on their list. The list won five mandates, and he was not returned.

Notwithstanding its alliance with the Progressive Party at the provincial level, the PS once again fielded its own list for the 2020 local elections in Titel. Soro again appeared in the lead position and was this time elected when the list won two seats. He resigned his local mandate on 19 February 2021.

Electoral record

Provincial (Vojvodina)

References

1967 births
Living people
People from Titel
Members of the Assembly of Vojvodina
Socialist Party of Serbia politicians
Movement of Socialists politicians